Peacemaker  is the third studio album by American heavy metal band Texas Hippie Coalition. It was released on August 14, 2012 and reached No. 20 on the Billboard Hard Rock Albums chart. The singles, "Damn You to Hell" and "Turn It Up", were the first by the band to chart on the Billboard Mainstream Rock chart, peaking at 40 and 39, respectively.

Production 
The album was produced by Bob Marlette.

Composition 
According to lead vocalist Big Dad Ritch, "Peacemaker", the title track from the album, was written from the perspective of a gun, due to many of his previous compositions being written from his point of view.  He goes on to state that "I'm not using that gun to rob somebody, to take what they got, I'm gonna be using that gun to protect what's mine."  The album also contains the track "Turn It Up", which talks about a woman who was born to a religious leader who starts down the road to become an adult entertainer.

Track listing 
Source:

Personnel 
 Big Dad Ritch – lead vocals
 John Exall – bass
 Randy Cooper – guitar
 Wes Wallace – guitar
 Timmy Braun – drums

Charts

Singles

References

2012 albums
Texas Hippie Coalition albums
Albums produced by Bob Marlette